Xiangcheng District is one of five urban districts of Suzhou, Jiangsu province, China. It has a land area of 478 km2 and had a population of 380,000 in 2001.

Administrative divisions
In the present, Xiangcheng District has 4 subdistricts, and 4 towns.
4 subdistricts

4 towns

Other
 Xiangcheng Economic Development Zone

See also
Wu County

References

External links
 Official website of Xiangcheng District

 
Administrative divisions of Suzhou
County-level divisions of Jiangsu